Events in the year 961 in Norway.

Incumbents
Monarch: Haakon I Haraldsson

Events
Battle of Fitjar

Arts and literature

Births

Deaths

Norway